36 Ghante is a 1974 Hindi film directed by Raj Tilak. It stars Raaj Kumar, Mala Sinha, Sunil Dutt, Vijay Arora, Parveen Babi, Ranjeet, Danny Denzongpa in pivotal roles. It is a remake of the 1955 American film The Desperate Hours, which was adapted from Joseph Hayes' 1954 novel.

Plot

Three jailed convicts Himmat, his brother Ajit, and Dilawar Khan break out of prison and take over the household of Editor Ashok Rai. The escapees hold Ashok Rai, his wife Deepa Rai, son, Rajoo, and daughter Naina hostage. The convicts  plan to continue to hold the family hostage until their associate, Kamini, contacts them in person. The police investigation into their escape is coordinated by Inspector R.D. Wadekar, who has  no clue of to the whereabouts of the convicts.

Cast
Raaj Kumar as Editor Ashok Rai
Mala Sinha as Deepa Rai
Sunil Dutt as Himmat Singh
Vijay Arora as Vijay
Parveen Babi as Naina Rai
Ranjeet as Ajit Singh
Danny Denzongpa as Dilawar Khan
Iftekhar as Vijay's Father
Urmila Bhatt as Vijay's Mother
Ramesh Deo as Inspector R. D. Wadkar
Sonia Sahni as Kamini
Jankidas as Jankidas
Surendra as Ajit and Himmat's Step-father
Deven Verma as Delivery Van Driver

Music
The film's songs were composed by Sapan Chakraborty and the lyrics were written by Sahir Ludhianvi.

See also

 List of films featuring home invasions

References

External links 
 

1974 films
1970s Hindi-language films
Indian remakes of American films